Rupert of Palatinate-Simmern (16 October 1461 – 19 April 1507) was a German nobleman and clergyman of the house of Palatinate-Simmern. From 1492 until his death he was the forty-fifth bishop of Regensburg as Rupert II.

Life
He was the son of Frederick I, Count Palatine of Simmern and Margaret of Guelders. He and his brothers Stephen and Frederick matriculated in the juristic faculty of the 'Universitas Studii Coloniensis' (the old university of Cologne).

He suffered from a severe illness known as the Franzosenkrankheit or the French Disease, a term covering both syphilis and yaws - it prevented him from exercising his office and eventually proved fatal. His bishopric was devastated by the War of the Succession of Landshut and its territories were altered by the creation of the dukedom of Palatinate-Neuburg. One of those to whom he delegated his authority was the inquisitor Heinrich Kramer, to compensate for the lower clergy's lack of energy in prosecuting witches and wizards in Abensberg.

Bibliography 
 Michael Buchberger (ed.): 1200 Jahre Bistum Regensburg. Regensburg 1939, S.44f.
 Josef Staber: Kirchengeschichte des Bistums Regensburg. Regensburg 1966, S. 94f.

References

1461 births
1507 deaths
Roman Catholic bishops of Regensburg
15th-century Roman Catholic bishops in Bavaria
16th-century Roman Catholic bishops in Bavaria
Sons of monarchs